Meadowview is a neighborhood of Sacramento, California located in the southernmost region of the city.

Description
The Meadowview area is bordered by Florin road to the north, the Watt/I-80–Downtown–Meadowview Light Rail Line to the east, John Still Junior High School and an open field to the south, and State Route 160 on the west. Meadowview is located near Interstate Highway 5 (I-5).

The neighborhood started out with middle and working class Mexican-American and African-American families migrating from the Bay Area, Deep South, and Midwest. It was a tight-knit community with many families attending the same church congregations or sharing the bond of migration. Some residents were working professionals with college degrees including doctors, teachers and many veterans. During the late 1970s to early 1980s more families migrated from the Bay Area.

In the late 1960s, Meadowview was a new and growing suburb south of Sacramento.  Many young families moved into the area, along with many businesses.  Racial diversity was perhaps 90% white, 2% Asian, 2% Hispanic, and perhaps 2% black.

In the early 1970s the area was approved for low income loans and many of the area's new residents were afraid that Meadowview would change and become a high crime area.  Many families sold their homes and moved to other areas.  Within a few years the racial makeup of Meadowview went from about 90% white to majority black. Over the years the neighborhood has become more diverse, with African-Americans now making up just 25% of the neighborhoods population.

In the late 1970s and 1980s crime began to accelerate as the children grew older.  Two of the three gas stations at 24th and Meadowview had already closed, most of the small businesses had already gone out of business.  The Farmers Market at 24th and Meadowview closed because people were afraid to go there.  Crime spiked.  Automatic weapons fire could be heard once a week.  Cars in the area blared loud music.  Police chases in the area were commonplace as well as the Police helicopter circling overhead with its spotlight.

Meadowview eventually became a place where families could be raised safely but there are a few people who spin their cars in the residential area dangerously and have no regard for the safety of others. New additions such as the Samuel C. Pannell Community Center (named after the late African-American city official), Walgreens. The Community Center offers events such as Teen Unity (The Basement) and has a gym, computer lab and other facilities. Housing is increasing on the neighborhood's south side.

As of 2016, the neighborhood had become much more diverse. Racial diversity of the neighborhood was 34% Hispanic 25% African-American 20% Asian 12% White 5% Native Hawaiian or Pacific Islander & 4% Mixed Race.

In the late evening of March 18, 2018, an unarmed Stephon Clark was shot and killed by two Sacramento Police officers in Meadowview.

Schools 
The Meadowview area is part of the Sacramento City Unified School District which operates Mark Hopkins Elementary School, John Bidwell Elementary School, John D. Sloat Elementary School, Freeport Elementary School, Susan B. Anthony Elementary School, Edward Kemble Elementary School, Cesar Chavez Intermediate School, Rosa Parks Middle School (formerly C. M. Goethe), John H. Still K-8 and the Luther Burbank High School.

Crime 
Contrary to popular belief, Meadowview is part of a low crime area. Meadowview is located in District 8 in the City of Sacramento. District 8 ranks consistently second or third (out of eight) in the lowest amount of crime.

"Using crime statistics from Sacramento's Open Data Portal for 2016 and 2017, ABC10 learned Meadowview accounted for five percent of the violent crime that occurred within city limits over the past two years. In 2016, Meadowview accounted for 175 violent crimes of the 3,493 violent crimes in the city. In 2017, that number went nearly unchanged, with 191 violent crimes in Meadowview of the city's 3,702 total. 

In comparison, the Downtown/Midtown area, which also includes the Southern Pacific/Richards area, accounted for nearly 20 percent of the crime in the past two years. The region is slightly smaller than Meadowview.

South Natomas held about eight percent of the city's violent crime statistic share in 2016 and 2017, while the Del Paso Heights neighborhood accounted for another eight percent of violent crimes over the past two years.

The Arden area consisted of about six percent of the violent crimes in the city over the past two years.

Meadowview actually had a violent crime rate comparable to the North Natomas suburban region, which had a rate of four percent in the past two years. East Sacramento — one of the city's wealthiest neighborhoods — had a two percent violent crime rate, only slightly lower than Meadowview's rate," ABC News 10.

Notable residents
LeVar Burton, Actor
Mahisha Dellinger, Business Owner/Beauty Mogul & Author
Greg Vaughn, Major League Baseball player
Cornel West, Academic
X-Raided, convicted murderer, member of the Garden Blocc Crips, and rapper
Brotha Lynch Hung member of the Garden Blocc Crips, Rapper
C-Bo member of the Garden Blocc Crips, Rapper
Kevin Galloway American professional basketball player

References

External links
Google map of neighborhood

Neighborhoods in Sacramento, California